José Rochel Morales also known as Pitiu Rochel (July 30, 1943 – 9 February 2001) was a Spanish handball player. He competed in the 1972 Summer Olympics.

In 1972 he was part of the Spanish team which finished fifteenth in the Olympic tournament. He played two matches and scored nine goals.

References

1943 births
2001 deaths
Spanish male handball players
Olympic handball players of Spain
Handball players at the 1972 Summer Olympics